Chhampi is a village development committee in Lalitpur District in the Bagmati Zone of central Nepal. At the time of the 1991 Nepal census, it had a population of 5,162 people living in 928 individual households.

References

External links
UN map of the municipalities of Lalitpur District

Populated places in Lalitpur District, Nepal